The Grammy Awards (stylized as GRAMMY), or simply known as the Grammys, are awards presented by the Recording Academy of the United States to recognize "outstanding" achievements in the music industry. They are regarded by many as the most prestigious, significant awards in the music industry worldwide. It was originally called the Gramophone Awards, as the trophy depicts a gilded gramophone. The Grammys are the first of the Big Three networks' major music awards held annually, and is considered one of the four major annual American entertainment awards, alongside the Academy Awards (for films), the Emmy Awards (for television), and the Tony Awards (for theater). The first Grammy Awards ceremony was held on May 4, 1959, to honor the musical accomplishments of performers for the year 1958. After the 2011 ceremony, the Recording Academy overhauled many Grammy Award categories for 2012.

History

The Grammys had their origin in the Hollywood Walk of Fame project in the 1950s. As recording executives on the Walk of Fame committee compiled a list of significant recording industry people who might qualify for a Walk of Fame star, they realized that many leading people in their business would not earn a star on Hollywood Boulevard. They determined to rectify this by creating awards given by their industry similar to the Oscars and the Emmys. After deciding to go forward with such awards, a question remained what to call them. One working title was the ‘Eddie’, to honor Thomas Edison, the inventor of the phonograph. Eventually, the name was chosen after a mail-in contest whereby approximately 300 contestants submitted the name 'Grammy', with the earliest postmark from contest winner Jay Danna of New Orleans, Louisiana, as an abbreviated reference to Emile Berliner's invention, the gramophone. Grammys were first awarded for achievements in 1958.

The first award ceremony was held simultaneously in two locations on May 4, 1959, the Beverly Hilton Hotel in Beverly Hills, California, and the Park Sheraton Hotel in New York City, New York, with 28 Grammys awarded. The number of awards given grew, at one time reaching over 100, and fluctuated over the years with categories added and removed. The second Grammy Awards, also held in 1959, was the first ceremony to be televised, but the ceremony was not aired live until the 13th Annual Grammy Awards in 1971.

Latin Grammy Awards

The concept of a separate Grammy Awards for Latin music recorded in Spanish or Portuguese began in 1989, as it was deemed too large to fit on the regular Grammys ceremony. The Recording Academy then established the Latin Recording Academy in 1997, and the separate Latin Grammy Awards were first held in 2000. The Latin Grammys honor works recorded in Spanish or Portuguese from anywhere around the world that has been released either in Ibero-America, the Iberian Peninsula, or the United States.

COVID-19 Impact (2021-2022)
The 63rd Annual Grammy Awards were postponed from its original January 31, 2021, date to March 14, 2021, due to the music industry impact of COVID-19 pandemic.

The 64th Annual Grammy Awards were also postponed from its original January 31, 2022, date to April 3, 2022, due to health and safety concerns related to the COVID-19 Deltacron hybrid variant. The ceremony was also moved from the Crypto.com Arena in Los Angeles to the MGM Grand Garden Arena in Las Vegas due to the former having scheduling conflicts with sports games and concerts nearly every night through mid-April.

Gramophone trophy
The gold-plated trophies, each depicting a gilded gramophone, are made and assembled by hand by Billings Artworks in Ridgway, Colorado. In 1990, the original Grammy design was reworked, changing the traditional soft lead for a stronger alloy less prone to damage, making the trophy bigger and grander. Billings developed Grammium, a zinc alloy which they trademarked. Trophies engraved with each recipient's name are not available until after the award announcements, so "stunt" trophies are re-used each year for the ceremony broadcast.

By February 2009, some 7,578 Grammy trophies had been awarded.

Ceremonies
{| class="wikitable sortable plainrowheaders" style="width:99%;"
! scope="col" style="width:5em;" | Edition
! scope="col" style="width:18%;"| Date
! scope="col" style="width:26%;"| Venue
! scope="col" style="width:27%;"| Venue City
! scope="col" style="width:20%;"| Host
! scope="col" style="width:2%;"| Network
! scope="col" style="width:8%;"| Viewers (in millions)
|-
! scope="row" |1st
| May 4, 1959 
| rowspan=6|Various (including Beverly Hilton Hotel)
| rowspan=3|Beverly Hills & New York City
| Mort Sahl
| rowspan=12|NBC
| rowspan=18 
|-
! scope="row" |2nd
| November 29, 1959
| Meredith Willson
|-
! scope="row" |3rd
| April 13, 1961
| rowspan=2|None
|-
! scope="row" |4th
| May 29, 1962
| rowspan=3|Chicago, Los Angeles & New York City
|-
! scope="row" |5th
| May 15, 1963
| Frank Sinatra
|-
! scope="row" |6th
| May 12, 1964
| rowspan=2|None
|-
! scope="row" |7th
| April 13, 1965
| Beverly Hilton Hotel
| Beverly Hills
|-
! scope="row" |8th
| March 15, 1966
| rowspan=5|Various
| rowspan=5|Chicago, Los Angeles, Nashville and New York City
| Jerry Lewis
|-
! scope="row" |9th
| March 2, 1967
| rowspan=4|None
|-
! scope="row" |10th
| February 29, 1968
|-
! scope="row" |11th
| March 12, 1969
|-
! scope="row" |12th
| March 11, 1970
|-
! scope="row" |13th
| March 16, 1971
| Hollywood Palladium
| Los Angeles
| rowspan=7|Andy Williams
| rowspan=2|ABC
|-
! scope="row" |14th
| March 15, 1972
| Madison Square Garden
| New York City
|-
! scope="row" |15th
| March 3, 1973
| Tennessee Theatre
| Nashville
| rowspan=51|CBS
|-
! scope="row" |16th
| March 2, 1974
| Hollywood Palladium
| Los Angeles
|-
! scope="row" |17th
| March 1, 1975
| Uris Theater
| New York City
|-
! scope="row" |18th
| February 28, 1976
| rowspan=2| Hollywood Palladium
| rowspan=2| Los Angeles
|-
! scope="row" |19th
| February 19, 1977
| 28.86
|-
! scope="row" |20th
| February 23, 1978
| rowspan=3| Shrine Auditorium
| rowspan=3| Los Angeles
| rowspan=2| John Denver
| 
|-
! scope="row" |21st
| February 15, 1979
| 31.31
|-
! scope="row" |22nd
| February 27, 1980
| Kenny Rogers
| 32.39
|-
! scope="row" |23rd
| February 25, 1981
| Radio City Music Hall
| New York City
| Paul Simon
| 28.57
|-
! scope="row" |24th
| February 24, 1982
| rowspan=6| Shrine Auditorium
| rowspan=6| Los Angeles
| rowspan=4| John Denver
| 24.02
|-
! scope="row" |25th
| February 23, 1983
| 30.86
|-
! scope="row" |26th
| February 28, 1984
| 51.67
|-
! scope="row" |27th
| February 26, 1985
| 37.12
|-
! scope="row" |28th
| February 25, 1986
| Kenny Rogers
| 30.39
|-
! scope="row" |29th
| February 24, 1987
| rowspan=3|Billy Crystal
| 27.91
|-
! scope="row" |30th
| March 2, 1988
| Radio City Music Hall
| New York City
| 32.76
|-
! scope="row" |31st
| February 22, 1989
| rowspan=2| Shrine Auditorium
| rowspan=2| Los Angeles
| 23.57
|-
! scope="row" |32nd
| February 21, 1990
| rowspan=2|Garry Shandling
| 28.83
|-
! scope="row" |33rd
| February 20, 1991
| rowspan=2| Radio City Music Hall
| rowspan=2| New York City
| 28.89
|-
! scope="row" |34th
| February 25, 1992
| Whoopi Goldberg
| 23.10
|-
! scope="row" |35th
| February 24, 1993
| Shrine Auditorium
| Los Angeles
| rowspan=2| Garry Shandling
| 29.87
|-
! scope="row" |36th
| March 1, 1994
| Radio City Music Hall
| New York City
| 23.69
|-
! scope="row" |37th
| March 1, 1995
| rowspan=2| Shrine Auditorium
| rowspan=2| Los Angeles
| Paul Reiser
| 17.27
|-
! scope="row" |38th
| February 28, 1996
| rowspan=2| Ellen DeGeneres
| 21.50
|-
! scope="row" |39th
| February 26, 1997
| Madison Square Garden
| rowspan=2| New York City
| 19.21
|-
! scope="row" |40th
| February 25, 1998
| Radio City Music Hall
| Kelsey Grammer
| 25.04
|-
! scope="row" |41st
| February 24, 1999
| Shrine Auditorium
| rowspan=4| Los Angeles
| rowspan=2| Rosie O'Donnell
| 24.88
|-
! scope="row" |42nd
| February 23, 2000
| rowspan=3| Staples Center
| 27.79
|-
! scope="row" |43rd
| February 21, 2001
| rowspan=2| Jon Stewart
| 26.65
|-
! scope="row" |44th
| February 27, 2002
| 18.96
|-
! scope="row" |45th
| February 23, 2003
| Madison Square Garden
| New York City
| rowspan=2| None
| 24.82
|-
! scope="row" |46th
| February 8, 2004
| rowspan=14| Staples Center
| rowspan=14| Los Angeles
| 26.29
|-
! scope="row" |47th
| February 13, 2005
| Queen Latifah
| 18.80
|-
! scope="row" |48th
| February 8, 2006
| rowspan=6| None
| 17.00
|-
! scope="row" |49th
| February 11, 2007
| 20.05
|-
! scope="row" |50th
| February 10, 2008
| 17.18
|-
! scope="row" |51st
| February 8, 2009
| 19.04
|-
! scope="row" |52nd
| January 31, 2010
| 25.80
|-
! scope="row" |53rd
| February 13, 2011
| 26.55
|-
! scope="row" |54th
| February 12, 2012
| rowspan=5| LL Cool J
| 39.91
|-
! scope="row" |55th
| February 10, 2013
| 28.37
|-
! scope="row" |56th
| January 26, 2014
| 28.51
|-
! scope="row" |57th
| February 8, 2015
| 25.30
|-
! scope="row" |58th
| February 15, 2016
| 24.95
|-
! scope="row" |59th
| February 12, 2017
| rowspan="2"|James Corden
| 26.05
|-
! scope="row" |60th
| January 28, 2018
| Madison Square Garden
| New York City
| 19.80
|-
! scope="row"| 61st
| February 10, 2019
|rowspan=2| Staples Center
|rowspan=3| Los Angeles
|rowspan=2| Alicia Keys
| 19.88
|-
! scope="row" | 62nd
| January 26, 2020
| 18.70
|-
! scope="row"| 63rd
| March 14, 2021
| Los Angeles Convention Center
| rowspan=3| Trevor Noah
| 9.23
|-
! scope="row"| 64th
| April 3, 2022
| MGM Grand Garden Arena
| Las Vegas
| 9.59
|-
! scope="row"| 65th
| February 5, 2023
| Crypto.com Arena
| Los Angeles
| 12.55
|}

Categories

The "General Field" are four awards which are not restricted by music genre.

 The Album of the Year award is presented to the performer, featured artists, songwriter(s), and/or production team of a full album if other than the performer.
 The Record of the Year award is presented to the performer and/or production team of a single song if other than the performer.
 The Song of the Year award is presented to the songwriter(s) of a single song.
 The Best New Artist award is presented to a promising breakthrough performer (or performers) who in the eligibility year releases the first recording that establishes their public identity (which is not necessarily their first proper release).

Among three artists who have won all four awards, two won all four at once: Christopher Cross in 1981, and Billie Eilish in 2020, making her, at age 18, the youngest artist to do so. Adele won the Best New Artist award in 2009 and her other three awards in 2012 and 2017.

Other awards are given for performance and production in specific genres and for other contributions such as artwork and video. Special awards are also given for longer-lasting contributions to the music industry.

Because of the large number of award categories (78 in 2012, 81 in 2013, and 82 in 2014), and a desire to feature several performances by various artists, only awards with the most popular interest – typically about 10 to 12, including the four general field categories and one or two categories in the most popular music genres (i.e., pop, rock, country, and rap) – are presented directly at the televised award ceremony. Most other Grammy trophies are presented in a pre-telecast "Premiere Ceremony" in the afternoon before the Grammy Awards telecast.

2012 category restructuring

On April 6, 2011, the Recording Academy announced a significant overhaul of many Grammy Award categories for 2012. The number of categories was cut from 109 to 78. The most substantial change was eliminating the distinction between male and female soloists and between collaborations and duo/groups in various genre fields (pop, rock, rhythm and blues [R&B], country, and rap). Additionally, several instrumental soloist categories were discontinued; recordings in these categories now fall under general categories for best solo performances.

In the rock field, the hard rock and metal album categories were combined. The Best Rock Instrumental Performance category also was eliminated due to a waning number of entries.

In R&B, the distinction between best contemporary R&B album and other R&B albums has been eliminated, consolidated into one Best R&B Album category.

In rap, the categories for best rap soloist and best rap duo or group have been merged into the new Best Rap Performance category.

The roots category had the most eliminations. Up through 2011, there were separate categories for regional American music forms, such as Hawaiian, Native American, and Zydeco/Cajun music. A consistently low number of entries in these categories led the Recording Academy to combine these music variations into a new Best Regional Roots Music Album, including polka, which had lost its category in 2009.

In same-genre fields, the traditional and contemporary blues categories and the traditional and contemporary folk categories each were consolidated into one per genre due to the number of entries and the challenges in distinguishing between contemporary and traditional blues and folk songs. In the world music field, the traditional and contemporary categories also were merged.

In the classical field, its main category Best Classical Album, was discontinued because most recipients in the category had also won in other classical categories for the same album. Classical recordings are now eligible for the main Album of the Year category.

A few minor name changes were also made to better reflect the nature of the separate categories. The Recording Academy determined that the word "gospel" in the gospel genre field tends to connote images and sounds of traditional soul gospel to the exclusion of Contemporary Christian Music (CCM). Therefore, the field and some categories were renamed as Gospel/Contemporary Christian Music.

Since 2012
Since 2012, small adjustments have been made to lists of categories and genre fields. The number of categories has risen from 78 in 2012 to 84 since 2017. In 2020, amid the George Floyd protests, several urban, rap, and Latin music categories were renamed.
In 2022, the number of awards was increased from 86 to 91. Performance categories were added for the Americana and alternative music genres alongside new categories for video game score and spoken word poetry albums. A songwriter category (non-classical) and a song for social change category were also added and several categories were adjusted slightly.

Entry process and selection of nominees
Members of the National Academy of Recording Arts and Sciences (NARAS), both media companies and individuals, may nominate recordings for consideration. Entries are made and submitted online. When a work is entered, review sessions are held that involve over 150 recording industry experts, to determine that the work has been entered in the correct category.

The resulting lists of eligible entries are then circulated to voting members, each who may vote to nominate in the general fields (Record of the Year, Album of the Year, Song of the Year, and Best New Artist) and in up to nine out of 30 other fields on their ballots. The five recordings that earn the most votes in each category become the nominees, while in some categories (craft and specialized categories) review committees determine the final five nominees. There may be over five nominees if a tie occurs in the nomination process.

Although members of the Academy of Motion Picture Arts and Sciences generally are invited to screenings or are sent DVDs of films nominated for Oscars, NARAS members do not receive nominated recordings, but instead receive access to a private online listening service.

Final voting
After nominees have been determined, final voting ballots are sent to NARAS voting members, who may then vote in the general fields and in up to nine of the 30 fields. Members are encouraged, but not required, to vote only in their fields of expertise. Ballots are tabulated secretly by the independent accounting firm Deloitte Touche Tohmatsu. After vote tabulation, winners are announced at the Grammy Awards. The recording with the most votes in a category wins, and it is possible to have a tie (in which case the two [or more] nominees who tie are considered winners). Winners are presented with a Grammy Award; those who do not win receive a medal for their nomination.

In both voting rounds, academy members are required to vote solely based upon quality, without consideration for sales, chart performance, personal friendships, regional preferences or company loyalty. Gifts may not be accepted. Members are urged to vote in a manner that preserves the integrity of the academy and their member community. Although registered media companies may submit entries, they have no vote in the process.

The eligibility period for the 63rd Annual Grammy Awards was September 1, 2019, to August 31, 2020.

Certificates
In many categories, certificates are presented to those ineligible for a Grammy award but who did contribute to a winning recording. These certificates are known as Participation Certificates or Winners Certificates. Those eligible for a certificate can apply for one in the weeks after the Grammy ceremony.

Special honors
Grammy Legend

From time to time, a special Grammy Award of merit is awarded to recognize "ongoing contributions and influence in the recording field". It has come to be known as the Grammy Legend Award and the Grammy Living Legend Award at different ceremonies.   only fourteen solo musicians and one band have received this award.

Salute to Industry Icons Award
The Salute to Industry Icons Award honors those who have made innovative contributions to the music industry. Recipients include:

 Herb Alpert & Jerry Moss
 Irving Azoff
 Martin Bandier
 Richard Branson
 Clive Davis
 Ahmet Ertegun
 David Geffen
 Berry Gordy
 Lucian Grainge
 Jay-Z
 Debra L. Lee
 Doug Morris
 Mo Ostin
 L.A. Reid

In Memoriam
In past decades, remarks given by the president of The Recording Academy has been followed by an In Memoriam segment. The segment was aired in the broadcast's final hour, and later was preceded by the broadcast's final commercial break.

Venue

Before 1971, Grammy Award ceremonies were held in different locations on the same day. Originally New York City and Los Angeles were the host cities. Chicago joined as a host city in 1962 and Nashville became a fourth location in 1965.

The 1971 ceremony at the Hollywood Palladium in Los Angeles, was the first to take place in one location. In 1972, the ceremony was then moved to Madison Square Garden's Felt Forum in New York City, then moved in 1973 to Nashville's Tennessee Theatre. From 1974 to 2003, the Grammys were held in various venues in New York City and Los Angeles, including New York's Madison Square Garden and Radio City Music Hall; and Los Angeles’ Shrine Auditorium, Staples Center and Hollywood Palladium.

In 2000, the Crypto.com Arena (known as the Staples Center from 1999 to 2021) became the permanent home of the award ceremonies. The Grammy Museum was built across the street from the Crypto.com Arena in LA Live to preserve the history of the Grammy Awards. Embedded on the sidewalks on the museum streets are bronze disks, similar to the Hollywood Walk of Fame, to honor each year's top winners, Record of the Year, Best New Artist, Album of the Year, and Song of the Year. Since 2000, the Grammy Awards have taken place outside of Los Angeles only three times. New York City's Madison Square Garden hosted the awards in 2003 and in 2018, while the MGM Grand Garden Arena hosted in 2022.

The annual awards ceremony at the Crypto.com Arena requires that sports teams like the Los Angeles Kings, Los Angeles Lakers, Los Angeles Clippers and Los Angeles Sparks play an extended length of road games.

Leading winners

With 32 Grammy Awards, Beyoncé is the artist with the most Grammy wins. U2, with 22 Grammy Awards, holds the record for most awards won by a group.

Criticism
Commercialism
When Pearl Jam won a Grammy for the Best Hard Rock Performance in 1996, the band's lead singer Eddie Vedder commented on stage: "I don't know what this means. I don't think it means anything." In 2008, Glen Hansard, leader of the Irish rock group The Frames, stated that the Grammys represent something outside of the real world of music "that's fully industry based". He said he was not that interested in attending that year's ceremony, even though he had been nominated for two awards. Maynard James Keenan, lead singer of progressive rock band Tool, did not attend the Grammy Awards ceremony to receive one of their awards, explaining that:

The Grammys have also been criticized for generally awarding or nominating more commercially successful albums rather than critically successful ones. In 1991, Sinead O'Connor became the first musician to refuse a Grammy, boycotting the ceremony after being nominated for Record of the Year, Best Female Pop Vocal Performance, and Grammy Award for Best Alternative Music Performance. O'Connor would go on to win the latter award. She said her reasoning came from the Grammys' extreme commercialism.

Reactions to nominations and awards
The Grammys also have been criticized for snubbing awards to some nominated artists. The organization's awards journey states that nominees and winners are determined solely by Voting Members of the Recording Academy and that Voting Members are active creative professionals involved in the recording process, such as performers, songwriters, producers, and engineers.

Nomination review committees, composed of anonymous industry figures, were established following the 37th Grammy Awards, which attracted criticism for the slate of Album of the Year nominations. The winner, Tony Bennett's live album MTV Unplugged, competed against the live classical album The Three Tenors in Concert 1994, Seal's second eponymous album, and the twelfth albums from Bonnie Raitt and Eric Clapton, both longtime musical mainstays. Not nominated that year were several albums that would later be recognized as classics, including Nas's debut album Illmatic, Oasis's debut album Definitely Maybe, Hole's album Live Through This, Jeff Buckley's Grace, and the debut album from Wu-Tang Clan. The nomination review committees would be disbanded in 2021 following criticism of the lack of nominations for The Weeknd's album After Hours.

At the 38th Annual Grammy Awards, artist Mariah Carey was nominated for six awards for her album Daydream, including Album of the Year and Record of the Year for her single "One Sweet Day". Although critics believed Carey would be "cleaning up" that year, Carey ultimately lost in all her nominated categories that night, much to the shock of critics and Carey herself. In 2011, Los Angeles Times journalist Randall Roberts criticized the exclusion of Kanye West's My Beautiful Dark Twisted Fantasy from Album of the Year nominations for the 54th Grammy Awards. He described West's album as "the most critically acclaimed album of the year, a career-defining record". Roberts went on to criticize the Grammy Awards for being "mired in the past" and out of touch with "new media" and trends among music listeners such as music sharing, stating:

In an article for Time, journalist Touré also responded to the snub and expressed general displeasure with the awards, stating "I don't pretend to understand the Grammys. I have never been able to discern a consistent logic around who gets nominated or who gets statues. I comprehend the particular logic of the Oscars, but not the big awards for music. My normal state of confusion around what drives Grammy decisions was exponentialized this week when, to the shock of many, Kanye's masterpiece My Beautiful Dark Twisted Fantasy was not nominated for a Grammy for Album of the Year." He went on to compare understanding the Grammy Awards to Kremlinology and commented on The Recording Academy's exclusion of more "mature" hip hop albums as Album of the Year nominees, noting that it occasionally opts to nominate "pop-friendly" hip hop albums instead.

In a 2011 profile for The New York Times after the 53rd Grammy Awards, frontman Justin Vernon of indie band Bon Iver was asked about the Grammys and how he would react to a nomination for his group, to which he responded:

He reaffirmed this sentiment and commented about the Grammys, saying:

Bon Iver subsequently received four nominations in November for the 54th Grammy Awards. After winning, Vernon said in his acceptance, "It's really hard to accept this award. There's so much talent out here [...] and there's a lot of talent that's not here tonight. It's also hard to accept because you know, when I started to make songs I did it for the inherent reward of making songs, so I'm a little bit uncomfortable up here."

In his article "Everything Old Is Praised Again", Jon Caramanica of The New York Times criticized Grammy voters for being "conservative" and disregarding more "forward-looking" music and wrote in response to the 54th Grammy Awards, "for the umpteenth time, the Grammys went with familiarity over risk, bestowing album of the year honors (and several more) on an album that reinforced the values of an older generation suspicious of change." He cited the Grammy successes of Lauryn Hill's The Miseducation of Lauryn Hill (1998), Norah Jones' Come Away with Me (2003), and Adele's 21 (2011) as examples of "the Grammys drop[ping] a boatload of awards on a young female singer-songwriter and her breakthrough album". Of Kanye West's absence from the ceremony, Caramanica stated, "He didn't even bother to show up for the broadcast, which was well enough because hip-hop was almost completely marginalized."

In an article for The Huffington Post, music executive and author Steve Stoute criticized the Recording Academy and the Grammy Awards for having "lost touch with contemporary popular culture" and noted "two key sources" for it: "(1) over-zealousness to produce a popular show that is at odds with its own system of voting and (2) fundamental disrespect of cultural shifts as being viable and artistic." Stoute accused the academy of snubbing artists with more cultural impact, citing respective losses by the critical and commercial successes in Eminem's The Marshall Mathers LP (2000) and Kanye West's Graduation (2007) in the Album of the Year category. Stoute asserted that

In 2020, Canadian artist Abel Tesfaye, known by his stage name The Weeknd, was shut out from the Grammys when his fourth studio album, After Hours, received no nominations at the 63rd Annual Grammy Awards. This came as a surprise to critics, fans, and Tesfaye himself, who had a successful run in 2020 with the success of both his album and the single "Blinding Lights". Tesfaye responded by social media calling the Grammys "corrupt". Speculation arose that the announcement of his then-upcoming Super Bowl performance, as well as the discrepancy of being nominated as pop music versus R&B, contributed to the snubs. Harvey Mason, Jr. responded by saying:

We understand that The Weeknd is disappointed at not being nominated. I was surprised and can empathize with what he's feeling. His music this year was excellent, and his contributions to the music community and broader world are worthy of everyone’s admiration. We were thrilled when we found out he would be performing at the upcoming Super Bowl and we would have loved to have him also perform on the Grammy stage the weekend before. Unfortunately, every year, there are fewer nominations than the number of deserving artists. But as the only peer-voted music award, we will continue to recognize and celebrate excellence in music while shining a light on the many amazing artists that make up our global community. To be clear, voting in all categories ended well before The Weeknd’s performance at the Super Bowl was announced, so in no way could it have affected the nomination process. All Grammy nominees are recognized by the voting body for their excellence, and we congratulate them all.

Formatting
The Grammys' eligibility period runs from October 1 of one year until September 30 of the next year. Records released in the fourth quarter of a given year are not eligible for that year's awards (the submissions and first round ballots are underway at that time). This is despite the quarter falling during the Christmas and holiday season, when many physical albums have been traditionally released and are heavily purchased for holiday gift giving, and when Christmas music is at its natural peak.

Fans unfamiliar with the Grammys voting window perennially hold a mistaken notion that a favorite artist has then been snubbed; for example, Adele's album 25 was released in November 2015 and thus was ineligible for nomination for the 2015 awards, despite its massive sales, earning its Grammys (including Album of the Year) instead in 2017. Conversely, the Grammys often recognize work more than a year after it was released. Taylor Swift's 1989 won Album of the Year in 2016, even though the album came out in October 2014.

Accusations of racial bias

The Grammys have also been accused of being unfavorable and racist to black recording artists. In a 2017 interview Canadian artist Drake accused the awards of seeing him only as a rapper and not as a pop-music artist due to his previous work and heritage. He criticized the snubbing of "One Dance" for the Record of the Year award and the nomination of "Hotline Bling" for Best Rap Song and Best Rap/Sung Performance, despite it not being a rap song. The Atlantics Spencer Kornhaber accused the Grammys of "sidelining a black visionary work in favor of a white traditionalist one". Drake did not attend the 2017 awards ceremony where he was nominated. He had a performance in Manchester, England on February 12, 2017, the same night as the ceremony. Frank Ocean was vocal about boycotting the same Grammy Awards and did not submit his album Blonde for award consideration as a protest.

The Grammys were also criticized after the 59th Annual Grammy Awards when Adele's 25 (as mentioned above, released in late 2015) won Album of the Year over Beyoncé's album Lemonade (released in April 2016), which many music publications believed should have won the award. Steve Knopper of Rolling Stone magazine believed that she lost due to the Grammy voters being all white males and as well as for her pro-Black performance during the Super Bowl 50 halftime show. USA Today also criticized Beyoncé's loss stating that "Black artists have struggled to win album of the year". They also felt 25 won only due to the album's record-breaking sales rather than having cultural significance and the large impact that Lemonade had in 2016. Adele also expressed that Lemonade should have won over her for Album of the Year, stating in her acceptance speech:

 In 2019, for the first time, rap artists won major award nominations outside the rap categories when Childish Gambino won the first Song and Record of the Year awards ever for a rap song. Hispanic and Latino Americans (the largest minority in America) are more under-represented at the Grammy Awards, and their music is prone to be shifted to the categories of the Latin Grammy Awards unless they have a mainstream following.

In April 2022, the late Indian singer Lata Mangeshkar was omitted from the In Memoriam segment, and the nation's domestic media criticized the Grammys and Oscars for their Western-centric view of artists receiving attention over those throughout the rest of the world.

Issues with women
The Grammys have also been criticized for their treatment of female artists specifically. Notably at the 60th Annual Grammy Awards in 2018, New Zealand singer Lorde made headlines after turning down an offer to perform at the ceremony. She suggested that she was invited to perform alongside several other artists in a tribute to Tom Petty but was refused a solo slot, despite being nominated for the Album of the Year award and stated that each male nominee was allowed a solo performance. Lorde's mother Sonja Yelich also criticized the Grammys, pointing out an article that only nine percent of the nominees at the previous six Grammy ceremonies were women. After the 60th ceremony, several media outlets reported that the ceremony had failed women, specifically pointing to the most nominated female artist SZA who failed to win in any of her five nominated categories, and to the Best Pop Solo Performance category which included four female nominees but was won by Ed Sheeran. Neil Portnow, president of the Recording Academy, sparked controversy after stating in an interview that female artists needed to "step up" in order to win awards. Portnow's comments were criticized by many female musicians including Pink, Katy Perry, Vanessa Carlton, Sheryl Crow, Iggy Azalea, Halsey, and Charli XCX. They also caused the hashtag #GrammysSoMale to trend on social media.

Before the 61st Annual Grammy Awards in 2019, singer Ariana Grande decided not to perform or attend that year's ceremony over a disagreement about the song choices for her performance. An anonymous source told Variety that Grande felt "insulted" when producers refused to let the singer perform her latest single "7 Rings". They compromised by having her perform the song as part of a medley, but the condition that the producers choose the second song led Grande to withdraw from the show. The source said that the same stipulations were not imposed on other performers. Grande later accused Grammy producer Ken Ehrlich of lying about why she dropped out of the show. Ehrlich had said that Grande "felt it was too late for her to pull something together". Grande responded:

Despite the controversy, Grande won for Best Pop Vocal Album and in 2020 performed at the 62nd Annual Grammy Awards when nominated for five awards, including Album of the Year, but won none. Despite past controversies, female artists dominated the 63rd Annual Grammy Awards, with the big four awards being awarded entirely to women. Several women also broke records at that ceremony.

In May 2018, it was revealed that money intended for the Recording Academy charity MusiCares was siphoned off to pay for the cost overruns of hosting the 60th Annual Grammy Awards at New York City's Madison Square Garden. Concerning the controversies of hosting that year's Grammy Awards in New York, Dana Tomarken, the former executive vice president of the MusiCares foundation claimed wrongful termination. She alleges that she was fired for pushing back against the academy's "boys club". She claimed that by having the MusiCares Person of the Year Tribute to Fleetwood Mac at Radio City Music Hall, the event had to forgo its traditional VIP dinner and silent auction. She had already been offered a deal to have the event at the Barclays Center in Brooklyn. The Barclays Center is owned by AEG, which competes directly with The Madison Square Garden Company which owns Madison Square Garden and Radio City. Irving Azoff who then had a joint venture with the Madison Square Garden Company told Tomarken that the event can not be held at Barclays and had to be held at Radio City. Oak View Group which is associated with Azoff received 300 of the highest price tickets to the MusiCares event at Radio City. Oak View Group was supposed to sell them as a package deal which also included tickets to the Grammy Awards itself. MusiCares was promised to receive $1.5 million from those tickets according to Tomarken. Those 300 tickets were never sold and were then returned to MusiCares, which resulted in a loss.

Recording Academy CEO Deborah Dugan was placed on leave on January 16, 2020, after a complaint of bullying from a member of staff (according to an anonymous New York Times source), ten days before the 62nd Annual Grammy Awards. Dugan had complained internally, alleging a broken system of voting that was subject to conflicts of interest and unnecessary spending. On the nominations for the 61st Annual Grammy Awards, she stated that the voting process was an "outrageous conflict of interest" with several nominated artists sitting on the voting boards of their prospective categories. She claimed that "one artist who initially ranked 18 out of 20 in the 2019 'Song of the Year' category ended up with a nomination". She also claimed that a few artists like Ed Sheeran and Ariana Grande had the votes to be nominated for the category, but were ultimately omitted.

In 2020, comedy star Tiffany Haddish turned down the invitation to host the 63rd Grammy pre-telecast premiere ceremony when they said that she would have to pay her own way. In an exclusive interview with Variety, Haddish revealed that she was told to cover the cost of hair, makeup, and wardrobe for the three-hour event, adding, "I don't know if this might mean I might not get nominated ever again, but I think it's disrespectful". When contacted, The Recording Academy explained that the premiere Ceremony is not a CBS program and is hosted by the academy, a not-for-profit organization, meaning that artists, hosts and performers have to perform free every year. They also noted that the issue would have no impact in Haddish's future nomination.

In 2022, the Grammys were criticized for nominating, and subsequently awarding, Louis C.K. a Best Comedy Album prize for his comedy special Sincerely Louis C.K. The album made light of, and included jokes about, the multiple sexual misconduct revelations he had admitted to years earlier.

TV broadcasts and ratings
Before the first live Grammys telecast in 1971 on ABC, a series of filmed annual specials in the 1960s called The Best on Record was broadcast on NBC. The first Grammy Award telecast took place on the night of November 29, 1959, as an episode of the NBC anthology series NBC Sunday Showcase, which normally was devoted to plays, original TV dramas, and variety shows. Until 1971, awards ceremonies were held in both New York and Los Angeles, with winners accepting at one of the two venues. Television producer Pierre Cossette bought the rights to broadcast the ceremony from the National Academy of Recording Arts and Sciences and organized the first live telecast. CBS bought the rights in 1973 after moving the ceremony to Nashville, Tennessee; the American Music Awards were created for ABC by the late Dick Clark as a result.

The Recording Academy announced on June 21, 2011, that it had reached a new deal with CBS to keep the awards show on the network for another 10 years. As part of the new contract, the network would also air a "nominations concert" special in the last week of November, where nominations would be released during a special exclusive to CBS, rather than at a traditional early-morning press conference to a multi-network press pool. This was ended after the 2016 concert due to low ratings and criticism about the announcement format, and as of the 2017 nominations, they have been revealed in a roundtable conversation with Recording Academy representatives during CBS Mornings'', though since 2020, it has returned to a traditional noontime Eastern press release statement and highlight of in-show award nominees on social media. In 2016, the Grammys became the first awards show to regularly air live annually in all U.S. territories, and for decades, alongside the Academy Awards, Primetime Emmy Awards and Tony Awards, the shows have aired live in over 150 countries worldwide.

From 2004 to 2019, the Grammys were held on the second Sunday of February (the week after the Super Bowl), with two exceptions: if that day was February 14 (Valentine's Day), it was moved to the following day; if it was a Winter Olympics year, it was held earlier on the last Sunday of January (the week before the Super Bowl). Starting in 2020, the Academy Awards ceremony would move back to the second Sunday of February, forcing the Grammys to move back to the last Sunday of January to avoid conflict with either the Oscars or the Super Bowl. To allow enough time for preparation, the cutoff date for eligible recordings would move from September 30 to August 31. This change reduced the eligibility period for the 2020 awards to eleven months (October 1, 2018 August 31, 2019), a month shorter than usual.

Viewership by year

Impact on record sales
When the televised Grammys came into renown in 1975, a relationship between Grammy Award winners and subsequent record sales began. However, it was not until after 1984 that Grammy recipients' records showed a substantial increase in sales. This was largely due to an agreement made by NARAS and the National Association of Record Merchandisers (NARM). Under this agreement "record labels provided stickers, posters and other point-of-purchase material emblazoned 'Grammy Nominee' or 'Grammy Award Winner' that retailers could use to improve marketing effects."

See also

 List of Grammy Award winners and nominees by country

Footnote

References

External links
 
 
 Grammy Awards winners at Grammy.com (searchable database)
 CBS: Grammys Official broadcast for Grammys

 
1958 establishments in the United States
American annual television specials
American music awards
Awards established in 1958
Performing arts trophies
Recurring events established in 1958